Barth is a surname. Notable people with the surname include: 

Auguste Barth (1834–1916), French orientalist
Belle Barth (1911–1971), Jewish-American entertainer
Carl Georg Barth (1860–1939), Norwegian-American mathematician and mechanical engineer
Charles H. Barth (1858-1926), American Brigadier general
Christian Gottlob Barth (1799-1862), German Protestant minister, writer and publisher
Connor Barth (born 1986), American football player
Edgar Barth (1917–1965), German race-car driver
Edvard Kaurin Barth (1913-1996), Norwegian zoologist and photographer, husband of Sonja
Fredrik Barth (1928–2016), Norwegian anthropologist
Fredy Barth (born 1979), Swiss race-car driver
Heinrich Barth (1821–1865), German explorer
Heinz Barth (1920–2007), German Waffen-SS leader and war criminal
John Barth (born 1930), American novelist and short-story writer
Joseph Barth (1746–1818), Austrian ophthalmologist
Jürgen Barth (born 1947), German engineer and racecar driver
Jürgen Barth (cyclist) (1943–2011), German cyclist
Karl Barth (1886–1968), Swiss theologian
Mario Barth (born 1972), German comedian
Markus Barth (1915–1994), Swiss theologian, son of Karl
Kaspar von Barth (1587–1658), German writer
Marisa Ferretti Barth (1931–2021), Canadian senator
Marleen Barth (born 1964), Dutch politician, trade union leader and journalist
Matthew Barth, American engineer
Richard Barth (1850–1908), German violinist and composer
Sonja Barth (1923-2016), Norwegian environmentalist
Theodor Barth (1849-1909), German politician
Uta Barth (born 1958), German-American photographer
Wolf Barth (1942–2016), German mathematician

See also

 Barth, Germany, a town in Mecklenburg-Vorpommern, Germany
 Barth (disambiguation)